The Orchard Theatre is a 1025-seat receiving theatre in the centre of Dartford, Kent. It was built by Dartford Borough Council and opened by The Duke of Kent on Thursday 14 April 1983. The theatre hosts a range of popular music, comedy, family, dance, drama, classical music and variety events, as well as an annual pantomime.

It has been run by HQ Theatres & Hospitality, part of Qdos Entertainment, since 2008.

References

External links

Official Website
Theatres Trust Database: The Orchard

Theatres in Kent
Dartford